The 1852 United States presidential election in New Jersey took place on November 2, 1852, as part of the 1852 United States presidential election. Voters chose seven representatives, or electors to the Electoral College, who voted for President and Vice President.

New Jersey voted for the Democratic candidate, Franklin Pierce, over the Whig Party candidate, Winfield Scott. Pierce won the state by a margin of 6.91%, making him the first Democratic presidential candidate since Andrew Jackson in 1832 to win the state. This is the last time that a Democrat won without carrying Middlesex County.

Results

See also
 United States presidential elections in New Jersey

References

New Jersey
1852
1852 New Jersey elections